Gyula Y. Katona (born December 4, 1965) is a Hungarian mathematician, the son of mathematician Gyula O. H. Katona.

Katona is the coauthor of three textbooks, Introduction to Computer Science (Typotex, Budapest, 2002), Introduction to Finite Mathematics, (Eötvös L. University, Budapest, 1993), and Combinatorics, Graph Theory and Algorithms (Technical University of Budapest, 1993). In addition his research publications include several works on Hamiltonian cycles and related properties of graphs.

External links 
 Katona's web site
 Katona at the Mathematics Genealogy Project

20th-century Hungarian mathematicians
Combinatorialists
Living people
1965 births